Nurita Maliha Aryanee "Ary" Abdul Malik (October 16, 1971 – February 28, 2017) was a Malaysian actress and television personality, and sister of singer Min Malik. Throughout her two decades of entertainment career, Ary is best known as a VJ on MTV and became one of the first contestants of MasterChef Malaysia. She died on February 28, 2017, after a year of battling ovarian cancer.

Early and personal life 
Ary was born and raised in Kuala Lumpur. Her father was a military pensioner. Her younger sister, Yasmin Malik or better known as Min Malik is a famous singer of the 90s, Min popular with the song "Flora Cinta". She married creative director Shahrul Nizam Shahruddin or Sha Bromo from Singapore in 1997, and was they had three daughters Nuhr Zoe Iman (born 1998), Dinda Pelangi Timor (born 2004) and Ratu Chinta Mecca (born 2006).

Filmography

Film

Drama

Television film

Television

References

External links
 

1971 births
2017 deaths
People from Kuala Lumpur
Malaysian film actresses
Malaysian television actresses
Malaysian television presenters
Malaysian women television presenters
Malaysian people of Malay descent
Malaysian Muslims
20th-century Malaysian actresses
21st-century Malaysian actresses
Deaths from cancer in Malaysia
Malik, Ary